Perspicaris (from the Latin perspicax, meaning “sharp-sighted,” and caris, “crab/shrimp”) an extinct genus of bivalved arthropod from the Cambrian period. Fossils have been found in North America, primarily the Burgess Shale of British Columbia, Canada but also possibly the Wheeler Shale, Marjum Formation, Pioche Shale and Bloomington Formation. Two named species are known from the Burgess Shale Perspicaris dictynna and Perspicaris recondita, which differ in maximum size ( in P. recondita vs  in P. dictynna), as well as proportions of the tail. Both species have a pair of stalked eyes, as well as a pair of large segmented antennae. The tail is forked and spiny. They are thought to have been active swimmers (nektonic).

Perspicaris has been identified as a member of a clade Hymenocarina close to the crown-group of Euarthropoda, which includes myriapods, chelicerates, insects and crustaceans.

References 

Burgess Shale fossils
Prehistoric arthropod genera
Wheeler Shale
Fossil taxa described in 1977

Hymenocarina